The Maine Black Bears football program from 1900 to 1909 represented the University of Maine in its second decade of intercollegiate football.

1900

The 1900 Maine Black Bears football team was an American football team that represented the University of Maine during the 1900 college football season. In its first and only season under head coach Ernest Burton, the team compiled a 4–4 record. Ralph Wormell was the team captain.

Schedule

1901

The 1901 Maine Black Bears football team was an American football team that represented the University of Maine during the 1901 college football season. In its first season under head coach John Wells Farley, the team compiled a 7–1 record. Carlos Dorticos was the team captain.

Schedule

1902

The 1902 Maine Black Bears football team was an American football team that represented the University of Maine during the 1902 college football season. In its first and only season under head coach Edward N. Robinson, the team compiled a 6–2 record. Carlos Dorticos was the team captain.

Schedule

1903

The 1903 Maine Black Bears football team was an American football team that represented the University of Maine during the 1903 college football season. In its second and final season under head coach John Wells Farley, the team compiled a 5–3 record. Charles Bailey was the team captain.

Schedule

1904

The 1904 Maine Black Bears football team was an American football team that represented the University of Maine during the 1904 college football season. In its first and only season under head coach Emmett O. King, the team compiled a 3–4 record. Charles Bailey was the team captain.

Schedule

1905

The 1905 Maine Black Bears football team was an American football team that represented the University of Maine during the 1905 college football season. In its first season under head coach Frank McCoy, the team compiled a 3–3–1 record. Arthur Bennett was the team captain.

Schedule

1906

The 1906 Maine Black Bears football team was an American football team that represented the University of Maine during the 1906 college football season. In its second season under head coach Frank McCoy, the team compiled a 2–4–2 record. John Burleigh was the team captain.

Schedule

1907

The 1907 Maine Black Bears football team was an American football team that represented the University of Maine during the 1907 college football season. In its third season under head coach Frank McCoy, the team compiled a 2–4–2 record. Harrison Higgins was the team captain.

Schedule

1908

The 1908 Maine Black Bears football team was an American football team that represented the University of Maine during the 1908 college football season. In its fourth and final season under head coach Frank McCoy, the team compiled a 3–4 record. Harry White was the team captain.

Schedule

1909

The 1909 Maine Black Bears football team was an American football team that represented the University of Maine during the 1909 college football season. In its first season under head coach George Schildmiller, the team compiled a 3–4–1 record. Horace Cook was the team captain.

Schedule

References

1900–1909
Maine
Maine
Maine
Maine
Maine
Maine
Maine
Maine
Maine
Maine
Maine Black Bears football
Maine Black Bears football
Maine Black Bears football
Maine Black Bears football
Maine Black Bears football
Maine Black Bears football
Maine Black Bears football
Maine Black Bears football
Maine Black Bears football
Maine Black Bears football